Anthony Tan is a Malaysian businessman. He is the co-founder and chief executive officer of Grab, a publicly-traded technology company and first unicorn in Southeast Asia. In 2021, he was listed as one of Singapore's richest people with an estimated net worth of $790 million.

Early life and education
Tan was born in Malaysia. His father, Tan Heng Chew is the president of Tan Chong Motor, which assembles and distributes Nissan vehicles in the Southeast Asia region. Tan's great-grandfather was a taxi driver and his grandfather started the Japanese automotive industry in Malaysia. His mother, Khor Swee Wah, invested "several millions" in the startup company that would become Grab. He worked on the assembly line at his father's company and attended meetings with union bosses at a young age.

His first business venture was at the age of 11 when he began trading and accepting cash for X-Men comics. At the age of 14, he volunteered to raise money for the AIDS Foundation.

As an undergraduate, Tan attended the University of Chicago and received a bachelor's degree in economics and public policy. He later graduated from Harvard Business School with a master's of business administration.

Career
Tan was the head of supply chain and marketing at Tan Chong Group for the automotive brands under the Tan Chong Motor conglomerate. He chose not to work for the family business and started to develop an idea for a company after a friend from Malaysia visited him and complained about the country's taxi system.

While attending Harvard Business School, Tan partnered with his classmate Tan Hooi Ling on making taxis safer in their home country of Malaysia in part due to ranking as the worst cab service in the world. They wrote a business plan for a taxi booking app, which won the second prize at the HBS New Venture Competition in 2011. Using the $25,000 of prize money from the competition, their own personal funds and an investment from Tan's mother, the duo launched MyTeksi in June 2012 with its headquarters in Kuala Lumpur.

By 2016, the company had rebranded as Grab and Tan was recognized along with his co-founder by Fortune and Straits Times as "40 Under 40" and "Asians of the Year", respectively. He was a speaker at the World Economic Forum in 2019. In 2021, Fortune named Tan and his co-founder on their list of "World's 50 Greatest Leaders".

Personal life 
Tan took up Singapore citizenship in 2016.

Tan is married to Chloe Tong, daughter of Tong Kooi Ong, founder of Phileo Allied Bank founder and owner of Edge Media Group, and they have four children.

References

Living people
Malaysian people of Chinese descent
University of Chicago alumni
Harvard Business School alumni
Chief executive officers

Year of birth missing (living people)